

199001–199100 

|-bgcolor=#f2f2f2
| colspan=4 align=center | 
|}

199101–199200 

|-id=194
| 199194 Calcatreppola || 2006 AO || Eryngium maritimum also known as Calcatreppola marittima, is a plant that can be found near seashores in Sardinia, Italy. The island's inhabitants name it "Corra de screu". || 
|}

199201–199300 

|-bgcolor=#f2f2f2
| colspan=4 align=center | 
|}

199301–199400 

|-bgcolor=#f2f2f2
| colspan=4 align=center | 
|}

199401–199500 

|-bgcolor=#f2f2f2
| colspan=4 align=center | 
|}

199501–199600 

|-id=574
| 199574 Webbert ||  || Richard Webbert (born 1959), a senior electrical engineer at the Johns Hopkins University Applied Physics Laboratory, who worked for the New Horizons mission to Pluto as the Power Systems Lead || 
|}

199601–199700 

|-id=631
| 199631 Giuseppesprizzi || 2006 GX || Giuseppe Sprizzi (born 1973), son-in-law of Italian amateur astronomer Vincenzo Casulli who discovered this minor planet || 
|-id=677
| 199677 Terzani ||  || Tiziano Terzani (1938–2004), Italian writer and journalist || 
|-id=687
| 199687 Erősszsolt ||  || Zsolt Erőss (1968–2013), the most successful Hungarian high-altitude mountaineer || 
|-id=688
| 199688 Kisspéter ||  || Péter Kiss (1986–2003), the first Hungarian mountaineer, who scaled all 82 four-thousanders in the Alps || 
|}

199701–199800 

|-id=741
| 199741 Weidner ||  || Scott E. Weidner (born 1961), an Assistant Vice President for Engineering at Princeton University, who worked for the New Horizons mission to Pluto as a SWAP Instrument Project Manager || 
|-id=763
| 199763 Davidgregory ||  || David Arthur Gregory (born 1951), a Canadian physician in St. Thomas, Ontario, who is an expert and collector of meteorites || 
|}

199801–199900 

|-id=838
| 199838 Hafili ||  || Mohamed Ali Hafili (born 1980), a Moroccan amateur astronomer from Marrakech who has organized several astronomical events in Morocco such as festivals, school stargazing and astronomical trips in the desert || 
|-id=900
| 199900 Brunoganz ||  || Bruno Ganz (1941–2019), a Swiss actor of theater and cinema || 
|}

199901–200000 

|-id=947
| 199947 Qaidam ||  || Qaidam, meaning salt marshes in Mongolian, located in the north of Qinghai-Tibet Plateau, is one of the China's four big basins and the main region of Haixi Mongolian-Tibetan Autonomous Prefecture || 
|-id=950
| 199950 Sierpc ||  || Sierpc, one of the oldest towns in the Mazovie Region of Poland || 
|-id=953
| 199953 Mingnaiben ||  || Min Naiben (1935–2018), a Chinese physicist, materials scientist, professor at Nanjing University, and an academician of the Chinese Academy of Sciences || 
|-id=986
| 199986 Chervone ||  || The Ukrainian village of Chervone, where airplanes had been manufactured, is located near the discovering Andrushivka Astronomical Observatory || 
|-id=991
| 199991 Adriencoffinet ||  || Adrien Coffinet (born 1990), a French astrophysicist and former exoplanet hunter at Geneva Observatory, who now works as a science journalist for Futura-Sciences (Src). || 
|-id=000
| 200000 Danielparrott ||  || Daniel Parrott (born 1987) is an American amateur astronomer and computer programmer. Parrott authored the software Tycho for asteroid discovery and follow up which is in wide use among amateur and professional astronomers. || 
|}

References 

199001-200000